Gustav "Gurkan" Björkman (born 24 February 1976) is a retired Swedish bandy forward.

He won the Swedish championship three times, with Sandvikens AIK in 1997 and 2003, and with Hammarby IF Bandy in 2010.

References

External links
  Gustav Björkman at Bandysidan.nu
  Gustav Björkman profile at Hammarby IF

Swedish bandy players
Living people
1976 births
Sandvikens AIK players
Skutskärs IF players
Bollnäs GIF players
Hammarby IF Bandy players